DigiCert, Inc. is an American digital security company headquartered in Lehi, Utah, with over a dozen global offices in various countries including: Australia, Belgium, Bermuda, Ireland, Japan, India, Germany, France, Netherlands, South Africa, Switzerland and United Kingdom. As a certificate authority (CA) and trusted third party, DigiCert provides the public key infrastructure (PKI) and validation required for issuing digital certificates or TLS/SSL certificates. These certificates are used to verify and authenticate the identities of organizations and domains and to protect the privacy and data integrity of users’ digital interactions with web browsers, email clients, documents, software programs, apps, networks and connected IoT devices.

According to independent survey company Netcraft, "DigiCert is the world's largest high-assurance certificate authority, commanding 60% of the Extended Validation Certificate market, and 96% of organization-validated certificates globally." DigiCert has 100+ Patents and Patents Pending.

History

DigiCert was founded by Ken Bretschneider in 2003. Bretschneider served as CEO and chairman of the board until 2012 when he was appointed Executive chairman and Nicholas Hales became CEO. In 2016, the company named John Merrill CEO.

In 2005, DigiCert became a founding member of the CA/Browser Forum and remains active in the forum today.

In 2007, DigiCert partnered with Microsoft to develop the industry's first multi-domain (SAN) certificate.

In 2015, DigiCert acquired the CyberTrust Enterprise SSL business from Verizon Enterprise Solutions, becoming the world's second-largest certificate authority for high-assurance or extended validation (EV) TLS/SSL certificates.

On August 28, 2015, in one of the largest investments in a Utah-based company to date, private equity firm Thoma Bravo acquired a majority stake in DigiCert, with TA Associates a leading global growth private equity firm, holding a minority share. Thoma Bravo was quoted as saying, "DigiCert represents an outstanding investment opportunity to back a market leader… known for its consistent innovation and first-rate customer service."

In 2017, DigiCert acquired the TLS/SSL and PKI businesses from the world's largest certificate authority, Symantec (including brands GeoTrust, RapidSSL (part of GeoTrust), Thawte and Verisign), for $950 million.  The acquisition resulted from questions first raised in 2015 by web browsers Google and Mozilla about the authenticity of certificates issued by Symantec, which represented one-third of all TLS/SSL certificates on the web. In September 2017, Google and Mozilla announced they would "... reduce, and ultimately remove, trust in Symantec's Root Keys in order to uphold users’ security and privacy when browsing the web." The final distrust deadline for certificates chaining to Symantec roots was set for October 2018. Symantec agreed to transfer its certificate business to its top TLS/SSL competitor, DigiCert, whose roots were trusted by browsers. In December 2017, DigiCert began issuing free replacements for all distrusted certificates from Symantec, GeoTrust, RapidSSL, Thawte and VeriSign. By Oct. 2018, the company had revalidated more than 550,000 organizational identities and issued more than 5 million replacement certificates for affected customers.

In 2018, DigiCert acquired QuoVadis, a trust service provider (TSP) headquartered in Switzerland offering qualified digital certificates, PKI services and PrimoSign electronic signature software. Qualified digital certificates from QuoVadis (now backed by DigiCert) comply with eIDAS, a set of EU standards for electronic transactions requiring legal proof of authentication. The EU Payment Services Directive mandated that banks and other financial institutions operating in Europe begin using qualified digital certificates by Jun. 2019. According to DigiCert, "... the QuoVadis acquisition aligns with the company's vision of providing globally dispersed and robust PKI-based solutions with local support."

In 2019, the company announced a new R&D division called DigiCert Labs, "... an initiative dedicated to researching and developing innovative approaches to security challenges." DigiCert Labs will collaborate with other enterprise labs – including Microsoft Research, Utimaco, ISARA and Gemalto – and make grants to universities for the study of topics related to authentication, data integrity, encryption and identity. Initial research projects will focus on post-quantum cryptography and machine learning. In 2019, DigiCert also launched the first post-quantum computing tool kit.

In 2019, Clearlake Capital Group, L.P., a leading private investment firm, and TA Associates, an existing investor, reached an agreement to make a strategic growth investment in DigiCert. As part of the transaction, Clearlake and TA Associates become equal partners in the company.

In 2020, according to independent survey company Netcraft, "DigiCert is the world's largest high-assurance certificate authority, commanding 60% of the Extended Validation Certificate market, and 96% of organization-validated certificates globally."

DigiCert is a member of the CA/Browser Forum, an industry consortium that creates guidelines and standards for participating certificate authorities and web browsers. Dean Coclin, Sr. Director of Business Development at DigiCert, served as vice-chairperson of the CA/Browser Forum from Nov. 1, 2018 until Oct. 31, 2020.

DigiCert Inc. is of no relation to Digicert Sdn. Bhd, a Malaysian-based certification authority that issues certificates with weak keys and had its trust revoked by web browsers.

In January 2022, DigiCert acquired IoT security company Mocana. In June 2022, the company acquired DNS Made Easy, a DNS services provider.

On October 19, 2022, DigitCert named Dr. Amit Sinha CEO and board member. Amit had previously lead technology and innovation at cybersecurity leader Zscaler the previous 12 years.

Awards 

 2022 - Best Companies to Work For in Utah
 2022 - American Business Awards® Identity & Access Security Solution: DigiCert ONE 
 2022 - CRN The 10 Coolest IoT Security Companies: The Internet Of Things 50 
 2021 - CRN The 20 Coolest Web, Application and Email Security Companies: The Security 100
 2021 - IoT Breakthrough Award, IoT Security Product of the Year
 2020 - IoT Product of the Year Award Recipient: DigiCert ONE 
 2020 - CRN The 20 Coolest Web, Email and Application Security Companies: The Security 100
 2020 - Frost & Sullivan 2020 Global Company of the Year Award in TLS Certificate Market
 2019 - CRN Security 100: 20 Coolest Email, Web and Application Security Vendors
 2018 - American Business Awards® New Product or Service of the Year - Software - Application Programming Interface (API) Management Solution
 2018 - American Business Awards® New Product or Service of the Year - Software - Healthcare Technology Solution
 2017 - Frost & Sullivan 2017 North American Visionary Innovation Leadership Award for Internet of Things Security

Criticism 
In 2019, Google security researcher Scott Helme revoked approximately a million dollars worth of extended verification certificates, a significant portion of which were DigiCert certificates.

QWAC and EV 
DigiCert was condemned for pushing QWAC scheme of certificate similar to EV certificates that undermined trust in certificates.

References

External links
 

Certificate authorities
Privately held companies based in Utah
Technology companies established in 2003
American companies established in 2003
2003 establishments in Utah
Companies based in Utah County, Utah
Lehi, Utah